Helga Erhart is an Austrian para-alpine skier. She represented Austria at the 1994 Winter Paralympics. In total, she won three medals: one gold medal and two silver medals.

She won the gold medal at the Women's Slalom LW2 event and the silver medals at the Women's Giant Slalom LW2 and the Women's Downhill LW2 events.

See also 
 List of Paralympic medalists in alpine skiing

References 

Living people
Year of birth missing (living people)
Place of birth missing (living people)
Paralympic alpine skiers of Austria
Austrian female alpine skiers
Alpine skiers at the 1994 Winter Paralympics
Medalists at the 1994 Winter Paralympics
Paralympic gold medalists for Austria
Paralympic silver medalists for Austria
Paralympic medalists in alpine skiing
Austrian amputees
20th-century Austrian women
21st-century Austrian women